Richmond Mumford Pearson, Jr. (January 26, 1852 – September 12, 1923) was an American diplomat and member of the U.S. House of Representatives from North Carolina.

Biography
Richmond Mumford Pearson, Jr. was born 26 January 1852 at Richmond Hill in Yadkin County, North Carolina, the fourth of five children of North Carolina Supreme Court Justice Richmond Mumford Pearson.

Pearson studied law and was admitted to the bar in 1874.  The same year he was appointed United States consul to Verviers and Liège, Belgium, which he resigned in 1877.

Pearson was elected to one term (1884–86) in the North Carolina House of Representatives and later to two consecutive terms in the U.S. House, serving from 1895 to 1899.  When he ran for re-election in 1898, he was initially declared the loser, and William T. Crawford the winner.  But he successfully contested the election and was seated for the last half of the Fifty-sixth Congress (May 10, 1900 to March 1901).

President Theodore Roosevelt appointed Pearson consul to Genoa in 1901, ambassador to Persia in 1902, and ambassador to Greece and Montenegro in 1907.  He retired from the diplomatic service in 1909, and lived most of his later life at his home in Asheville, North Carolina, called "Richmond Hill"  (the same name as his father's home in Yadkin County). It was there that he died in 1923.

References

External links

Appalachian State University Library
National Register of Historic Places
Richmond Hill Inn website
University of North Carolina at Asheville Library

Ambassadors of the United States to Greece
1852 births
1923 deaths
Ambassadors of the United States to Iran
Republican Party members of the United States House of Representatives from North Carolina
Republican Party members of the North Carolina House of Representatives
Politicians from Asheville, North Carolina
19th-century American politicians
20th-century American politicians
20th-century American diplomats